Sixpence None the Richer is the third studio album by American band Sixpence None the Richer, released in 1997. It was certified platinum by the RIAA on February 9, 2000, for a million certified units in the United States and was nominated for a Grammy Award for Best Rock Gospel Album.

Track listing
All songs written by Matt Slocum, except where noted.

Notes
"There She Goes" did not appear on the album until a re-release in 1999. On the limited edition vinyl LP, the song "Sad But True" replaces "Puedo Escribir" and "Easy to Ignore".

Personnel 
Sixpence None the Richer
 Leigh Nash – vocals
 Matt Slocum – guitars, cello, string arrangements, Wurlitzer electric piano (3, 10)
 Sean Kelly – guitars
 J.J. Plasencio – bass (1-4, 6, 7, 9-11), acoustic bass (5), upright bass (8)
 Dale Baker – drums, percussion

Additional personnel

 Phil Madeira – Hammond B3 organ (2, 4, 9)
 John Mark Painter – mellotron (2), bells (3), accordion (4), oud (7), hurdy-gurdy (8, 11), muted trumpet (8)
 Tom Howard – acoustic piano (8)
 Al Perkins – pedal steel guitar (5, 8)
 Chris Donohue – bass (12)
 Justin Cary – bass (13)
 Mark Nash – cymbals (11), hi-hat (11)
 Kristin Wilkinson – viola (2, 3, 6, 11, 12)
 Peter Hyrka – violin (1, 10)
 Antoine Silverman – first violin (2, 3, 6, 11, 12), violin (5)
 David Davidson – second violin (2, 3, 6, 11, 12)

Production 

 Steve Taylor – producer
 Russ Long – engineer, mixing (1-10, 12)
 Ryan Freeland – second engineer
 Chris Grainger – second engineer
 Tara Wilson – second engineer
 Andreas Krause – additional engineer
 John Mark Painter – additional engineer
 Tony Palacios – additional engineer
 Bob Clearmountain – mixing (11)
 Tom Lord-Alge – mixing (13)
 Nathaniel Tarn – editing
 Bob Ludwig – mastering
 W.S. Merwin – translation
 Gina R. Binkley – design direction
 Beth Lee – art direction
 Janice Booker – design
 D.L. Taylor – cover and back paintings
 Ben Pearson – original photography
 Randee St. Nicholas – band photography
 Toni Armani – stylist
 Vector Management – management
 Recorded at The White House and The Carport (Nashville, Tennessee); Chelsea Recording Studios (Brentwood, Tennessee).
 Mixed at The Carport; Mix This! (Los Angeles, California); South Beach Studios (Miami Beach, Florida).
 Mastered at Gateway Mastering (Portland, Maine).

Charts
Album

Singles

References 

Sixpence None the Richer albums
1997 albums
Elektra Records albums